Rúben Luís Maurício Brígido (born 23 June 1991 in Leiria) is a Portuguese professional footballer who plays as a central midfielder for Kazakh club FC Caspiy.

Club statistics

References

External links

1991 births
Living people
People from Leiria
Sportspeople from Leiria District
Portuguese footballers
Association football midfielders
Primeira Liga players
Liga Portugal 2 players
C.D. Fátima players
U.D. Leiria players
C.S. Marítimo players
Liga I players
ASC Oțelul Galați players
Cypriot First Division players
Cypriot Second Division players
Ermis Aradippou FC players
Othellos Athienou F.C. players
Anagennisi Deryneia FC players
Nea Salamis Famagusta FC players
First Professional Football League (Bulgaria) players
PFC Beroe Stara Zagora players
Kazakhstan Premier League players
FC Ordabasy players
FC Tobol players
FC Caspiy players
Portugal youth international footballers
Portuguese expatriate footballers
Expatriate footballers in Romania
Expatriate footballers in Cyprus
Expatriate footballers in Bulgaria
Expatriate footballers in Kazakhstan
Portuguese expatriate sportspeople in Romania
Portuguese expatriate sportspeople in Cyprus
Portuguese expatriate sportspeople in Bulgaria
Portuguese expatriate sportspeople in Kazakhstan